Asymphorodes chalcopterus is a moth of the family Agonoxenidae. It was described by John Frederick Gates Clarke in 1986. It is found in French Polynesia.

References

Moths described in 1986
Agonoxeninae
Moths of Oceania
Endemic fauna of French Polynesia